Linchuan District is one of two districts of the city of Fuzhou, Jiangxi province, People's Republic of China.

Before A.D. 762, the administration region located in Chi gang, since then, the administration region moved to western bank of Lianfan river

Administrative divisions
In the present, Linchuan District has 7 subdistricts, 18 towns and 7 townships.
7 subdistricts

18 towns

7 townships

References

External links
  Government site - 

Fuzhou, Jiangxi
Linchuan